United States Supreme Court cases titled Davis v. United States:

Davis v. United States, 589 U.S. ___ (2020), a per curiam opinion
Davis v. United States (2011), 564 U.S. 229 (good-faith exception to the exclusionary rule)
Davis v. United States (1994), 512 U.S. 452 (invocation of the right to counsel under Miranda)
Davis v. United States (1990), 495 U.S. 472 (charitable deductions under §170 of the Internal Revenue Code)
Davis v. United States (1974), 417 U.S. 333
Davis v. United States (1973), 411 U.S. 233
Davis v. United States (1969), 394 U.S. 574
Davis v. United States (1960), 364 U.S. 505
Davis v. United States (1946), 328 U.S. 582
Davis v. United States (1897), 165 U.S. 373
Davis v. United States (1895), 160 U.S. 469

See also
United States v. Davis (disambiguation)